The Fat Boys Are Back is the second studio album by American hip hop group the Fat Boys, released on June 1, 1985, by Sutra Records. The album was produced by Kurtis Blow. The album peaked at number 63 on the US Billboard 200, and number 11 on the Top R&B/Hip Hop Albums chart. The album was certified Gold by the RIAA on January 9, 1986.

The album contains three the Billboard singles: "The Fat Boys Are Back", "Hard Core Reggae" and "Don't Be Stupid". The song "Pump It Up" was performed in the movie Krush Groove during the Disco Fever scene.

Track listing
"The Fat Boys Are Back" (Kurtis Walker, Mark Morales, Damon Wimbley, Darren Robinson) – 6:10	
"Don't Be Stupid" (Kurtis Walker) – 5:40	
"Human Beat Box" (Mark Morales, Damon Wimbley, Darren Robinson) – 3:16	
"Yes, Yes, Y'All" (Kurtis Walker, Mark Morales, Damon Wimbley, Darren Robinson) – 5:16	
"Hard Core Reggae" (Kurtis Walker, David Reeves, Mark Morales, Damon Wimbley, Darren Robinson) – 5:58	
"Pump It Up" (Kurtis Walker, David Reeves, Mark Morales, Damon Wimbley, Darren Robinson) – 6:25	
"Fat Boys Scratch" (Damon Wimbley) – 5:02	
"Rock 'N' Roll" (Kurtis Walker, David Reeves, Mark Morales, Damon Wimbley, Darren Robinson) – 6:00

Personnel
 Musicians: Steve Breck, Kurtis Blow, Danny Harris, Dave Ogrin, David Reeves
 Background vocals: Michelle Cobbs (track 1), Fonda Rae (1), Alyson Williams (1), Kurtis Blow (6), Larry Green (6), Danny Harris (6), David Reeves (6)
 Mixing: Kurtis Blow, Dave Ogrin
 Executive producer: Art Kass, Charles Stettler
 Mastering: Frankford/Wayne Mastering Labs
 Photography: Raeanne Rubenstein
 Design: Lynda West

Charts

Weekly charts

Certifications

References

External links
 The Fat Boys Are Back at Discogs
 The Fat Boys Are Back at RapGenius

1985 albums
The Fat Boys albums